The 2014 season is Start's 2nd season in the Tippeligaen since their promotion back to the league in 2012, and their fourth season with Mons Ivar Mjelde as manager. Start competed in the Tippeligaen and, finishing 12th, and the Norwegian Cup, where they were knocked out at the Fourth Round by Sarpsborg 08.

Squad

Transfers

Winter

In:

Out:

Summer

In:

Out:

Competitions

Tippeligaen

Results summary

Results by round

Results

Table

Norwegian Cup

Squad statistics

Appearances and goals

|-
|colspan="14"|Players away from the club on loan:

|-
|colspan="14"|Players who played for Start that left during the season:

|}

Goal scorers

Disciplinary record

References

External links 

Menigheden – official fan club

Norwegian football clubs 2014 season
2014